Antoine-Amédée-Marie-Vincent Manca Amat de Vallombrosa, Marquis de Morès et de Montemaggiore (14 June 1858 – 9 June 1896), commonly known as the Marquis de Morès, was a French duelist, frontier ranchman in the Badlands of Dakota Territory during the final years of the American Old West era, a railroad pioneer in Vietnam, and a politician in his native France.

Early life
Born Antoine-Amédée-Marie-Vincent Manca Amat de Vallombrosa on 14 June 1858. As the eldest son of the Duke of Vallombrosa, he used the courtesy title Marquis de Morès et de Montemaggiore, but he was usually called Marquis de Morès.

Morès began life as a soldier, graduating in 1879 from St. Cyr, the leading military academy of France. Among his classmates was Philippe Pétain, famous French general of World War I and the ill-fated future leader of the Vichy France government in World War II.

After St. Cyr, he entered Saumur, France's premier cavalry school, where he trained to be an officer. He was later sent to Algiers, helping to put down an uprising. It was while in Algiers that he had his first duel, starting his career as a celebrated duelist of his day.

The Badlands
He resigned from the cavalry in 1882 and married Medora von Hoffman (1856–1921), sometimes called the Marquise, the daughter of a New York banker. Soon thereafter, he would move to the North Dakota badlands to begin ranching, purchasing  for that purpose.  He also opened a stagecoach business. He named his simple vernacular house in Medora, North Dakota,  the "Chateau de Mores"; it is preserved as a historic house there.

He tried to revolutionize the ranching industry by shipping refrigerated meat to Chicago by railroad, thus bypassing the Chicago stockyards. He built a meat-packing plant for this purpose in Medora, the town he founded in 1883 and named for his wife.

He became famous in the West as a rancher and gunslinger, getting arrested for murder a few times. He was always acquitted. Known as an adventurer, he was quick to anger and was engaged in numerous duels throughout his life; he notoriously sent Theodore Roosevelt what the latter interpreted as a challenge to a duel. Roosevelt assured the Marquis by letter that he was “most emphatically” not his enemy, and nothing came of the matter. 

Outlaws were very numerous in the Badlands, and cattle and horse rustling had become unbearably common. Frontiersman Granville Stuart organized a vigilance committee to fight the rustlers. De Morès told Roosevelt of the plan, and the two offered their services to be vigilantes. Stuart declined, stating that de Morès and Roosevelt were both well known and their presence could ruin the element of surprise. Stuart's vigilantes, called The Stranglers, struck viciously against the rustlers, greatly weakening their power in the Badlands.

By 1885 it became obvious that de Morès' business was failing. He was losing a business war against the beef trust, and the enterprise collapsed. He would later sell the ranch and other assets in the Badlands.

Gulf of Tonkin
Subsequently, he left Dakota Territory and returned to France. He was commissioned by the French army to build a railroad in Vietnam, from the Chinese frontier to the Gulf of Tonkin, and arrived in Asia to lead construction in the fall of 1888. He observed the Vietnamese people, and cautioned the French to be kind to them. He wrote, "The colonization of Tonkin will not be accomplished with rifles, but with public works."

He believed a railroad was needed there, and hoped to have one extending all the way to Yunnan Province in China. This was partly a reaction to a British railroad being built from Burma to China.

Political intrigue, being notorious in France in that day, impeded construction of the railroad. A prime minister was deposed, which led to a new undersecretary of the navy, Jean Constans, who opposed de Morès' plan from the start. The Marquis was recalled to France in 1889, and the railroad project was ruined.

France, Algeria, assassination
Upon his return, he would be embroiled in political controversies for the remainder of his life.

He started by attacking Constans, enlisting the aid of Georges Clemenceau, but failed to unseat him in the next election. His politics became overtly anti-Semitic, and he challenged Ferdinand-Camille Dreyfus, a Jewish member of the Chamber of Deputies, to a duel after Dreyfus wrote an article attacking him. De Morès said he wanted Gaul for the Gauls, and Dreyfus replied by writing that de Morès had a Spanish title, a father with an Italian title, and an American wife who was neither Christian nor French. At the duel Dreyfus fired first and missed, and the Marquis wounded his opponent in the arm.

In 1889 de Morès joined La Ligue antisémitique de France (Antisemitic League of France) founded by Edouard Drumont. After more verbal attacks on Jews, he went to Algeria to strengthen the French hold there and stop British advances into the interior of Africa. He used anti-Semitic rhetoric to his advantage in Algeria, giving speeches claiming that French and African Jews and the British were conspiring to conquer the entire Sahara Desert. With the British in a difficult position in the Sudan after the death of General Charles George Gordon in the siege of Khartoum, de Morès planned a trip there to meet with the Mahdi, a powerful Muslim leader who was intent on undermining British hegemony in the region. He traveled to North Africa, selected Arabic men in Tunis to escort him, and set out his caravan towards Kebili.

The French officer in charge of the post at Kebili, Lieutenant Leboeuf, received a telegram from the French Intelligence Officer and Military attaché in Tunis, advising him not to give de Morès' expedition any assistance. Furthermore, Leboeuf was told to ensure de Morès traveled by the way of the Berresof oasis. A marabout from Guemar dispatched a messenger to dissident Tuareg in Messine, southeast of Ghadames, telling them to come to Berresof at once to kill a Frenchman. The recipients of the message were told the man they were to kill would be carrying a great deal of money, would not have an official escort, and that whoever killed him would not be prosecuted. While he was in Kebili, de Morès received a telegram from General de la Roque, commander of the division at Constantine, Algeria, telling him that Tuareg guides would be waiting for him at Berresof. De Morès expressed surprise at this, as he had not asked de la Roque to find him any guides. De Morès departed Kebili on May 20, and the Tuareg "guides" joined his caravan on June 3. On the morning of June 9 the Tuareg sprung their attack. De Morès was able to kill several of his attackers before he was gunned down.

On 28 July 1902, after a trial in Sousse in Tunisia, two of the murderers were sentenced: El-Kheir ben Abd-el-Kader to the death penalty and Hamma Ben Cheikh to 20 years of forced labor. During the trial his widow, the Marquise, sought to expose the French government as responsible for the murder but the tribunal did not agree. She then even paid Isabelle Eberhardt to return to Africa to investigate his death, though Eberhardt made no real attempts to investigate the matter, and no government official was ever convicted.

See also

De Mores Packing Plant Ruins, listed on the U.S. National Register of Historic Places (NRHP)
Chateau de Mores, built 1883, Medora, North Dakota, NRHP-listed
Von Hoffman House, Medora, North Dakota, NRHP-listed

References

Sources

NPS: Theodore Roosevelt and the Dakota Badlands

Further reading
 Antonio Areddu, Vita e morte del marchese di Mores Antoine Manca (1858-1896), Cagliari, Condaghes, 2018
Antonio  Areddu,  Il marchesato di Mores. Le origini, il duca dell´Asinara, le lotte antifeudali, l´abolizione del feudo e le vicende del marquis de Morès, Cagliari, Condaghes, 2011
Marquis de Mores: a biography by Dr. D. Jerome Tweton

1858 births
1896 deaths
American cattlemen
American city founders
Assassinated French politicians
Burials at the Cimetière du Grand Jas
French duellists
French emigrants to the United States
French marquesses
Marquesses of Morès
Marquesses of Montemaggiore
People from Billings County, North Dakota
People of the American Old West
Theodore Roosevelt
Antisemitism in France
Far-right politicians in France